The 2023 Summer Universiade, the XXXI Summer World University Games, commonly known as the Chengdu 2023 FISU World University Games, is a upcoming multi-sport event sanctioned by the International University Sports Federation (FISU), scheduled to be held from 28 July to 8 August, 2023 in Chengdu, Sichuan, China. These will be the third edition of the Games to be hosted by China, and the first edition to be branded under the "Summer World University Games" title rather than "Summer Universiade".

The Games were originally scheduled for the period from  16—27 August 2021. On 2 April 2021, it was announced that the Games would be postponed by one year to 2022 due to the global COVID-19 pandemic and a  the clash of dates with the 2020 Summer Olympics with scheduling to be announced at a later date. The Games were planned to continue to be branded as Chengdu 2021. In May 2021, FISU confirmed that the Games had been rescheduled for the end of June and early july in 2022. On 6 May 2022, FISU announced that the Games had been postponed again to 2023 due to COVID-19 concerns; the Games will effectively replace the 2023 Summer World University Games in Yekaterinburg, whose rights to host the Games had been stripped due to the 2022 Russian invasion of Ukraine.

Host selection

On 1 September 2014, FISU opened bids for the 2021 Winter and Summer Universiades. Bucharest, Romania and Santiago de Cali, Colombia announced intents to submit bids for the Summer Universiade. Turkmenistan was offered to host the Games, but declined. On 14 October 2018, it was reported that the FISU had proposed a joint bid between Seoul, South Korea and Pyongyang, North Korea, during a meeting between Mayor of Seoul Park Won-soon and the FISU's secretary-general Eric Saintrond.

On 13 December 2018, it was reported that a representative of Chengdu, China had signed a "pre-attribution contract" with the FISU at a meeting of its steering committee in Braga, Portugal. On 1 March 2019 prior to the Winter Universiade in Krasnoyarsk, Chengdu was officially announced at the host of the 2021 Summer Universiade.

Venues
The following are the venues of the 2021 Summer World University Games:

Dong'an Lake Sports Complex
Dong'an Lake Stadium - Opening ceremonies
 Dong'an Lake Arena – Gymnastics (Artistic) and Closing Ceremonies
Dong'an Lake Sports Park Aquatics Centre – Swimming

Shuangliu District
Shuangliu Modern Pentathlon Centre  – Archery and Water polo
Shuangliu Sports Centre Stadium – Athletics
 Shuangliu Sports Centre Gymnasium – Badminton
Sichuan International Tennis Centre – Tennis

Xindu District
Xindu Xiangcheng Sports Centre Natatorium -Water polo

Wuhou District
 Sichuan Provincial Gymnasium -Basketball
 Sichuan University Gymnasium -Basketball

Jinniu District
Fenghuangshan Arena – Basketball
 Chengbei Gymnasium – Wushu

Pidu District
 Pidu Sports Centre Natatorium – Fencing
 Xihua University Gymnasium - – Volleyball

Longquanyi District
Chengdu Sport University Gymnasium – Gymnastics (Rhythmic)

Xinjin District
Sichuan Water Sports School – Rowing

Qingbaijiang District
 Qingbaijiang Sports Centre Gymnasium – Basketball

Wenjiang District
 Chengdu University of Traditional Chinese Medicine Wenjiang Campus Gymnasium  – Basketball and Volleyball
 Sichuan Vocational and Technical College of Communications Hongyi Gymnasium- Volleyball

Jinjiang District
 Sichuan Water Sports School – Rowing
Jinjiang International Event Centre – Basketball

Chengdu Hi-Tech Industrial Development Zone
  Chengdu High-tech Sports Centre – Table tennis
 Southwest Jiaotong University Xipu Campus Gymnasium – Volleyball
 University of Electronic Science and Technology of China Qingshuihe Campus Gymnasium – Basketball

Qingyang District
Sichuan Normal University, Wanjiang Campus Gymnasium – Taekwondo
 Southwestern University of Finance and Economics Guanghua Campus Gymnasium- Volleyball

Jianyang City
 Cultural and Sports Centre Gymnasium – Judo
 Cultural and Sports Centre Natatorium – Diving

Sports
Because of the creation of the FISU University Football World Cup in 2019, the sport will no longer be part of the Summer World University Games program starting at that year. With this change, the number of compulsory sports will be kept at fifteen, since the place will be occupied by badminton which after five editions as an optional sport turned a compulsory sport.

 Aquatics
 
 
 
 
 
 
 
 
 
 Artistic gymnastics (14)
 Rhythmic gymnastics (8)

Marketing

Motto

Logo

The logo of the World University Games in Chengdu draws inspiration from the sunbird, a symbol of ancient Sichuan culture and also from the letter 'U' that stands for university sports.

Mascot

The mascot "Rong Bao", a Giant panda, was unveiled on 30 December 2019. "蓉" stands for Chengdu and "宝" means baby.

Schedule

Participating nations

Non-participating countries

Withdrew from the games
  United States (swimming team)

Banned countries
Both Belarus and Russia are banned from the games due to the Russian invasion of Ukraine.
  Belarus 
  Russia

See also
 Previous Universiades celebrated in China
 2001 Summer Universiade - Beijing
 2009 Winter Universiade - Harbin
 2011 Summer Universiade - Shenzhen
 Other international multi-sport events held or set to be held in China in 2023
 2022 Asian Games - Hangzhou

Notes

References

External links
Universiade Chengdu 2021

2021
Universiade Summer
University Games
Summer Universiade
International sports competitions hosted by China
Sport in Chengdu
Multi-sport events in China
Summer World University Games, 2021
Summer World University Games, 2021